Craugastor mimus is a species of frog in the family Craugastoridae. It is found in lowland and premontane forests on the Atlantic versant from eastern Honduras through eastern Nicaragua to central Costa Rica.
Its natural habitat is lowland and premontane moist and wet forests.
It is threatened by habitat loss.

References

mimus
Amphibians of Costa Rica
Amphibians of Honduras
Amphibians of Nicaragua
Amphibians described in 1955
Taxa named by Edward Harrison Taylor
Taxonomy articles created by Polbot